= Senior Center for the Arts, Inc. =

Coordinates: 36.1667°N 86.6642°W

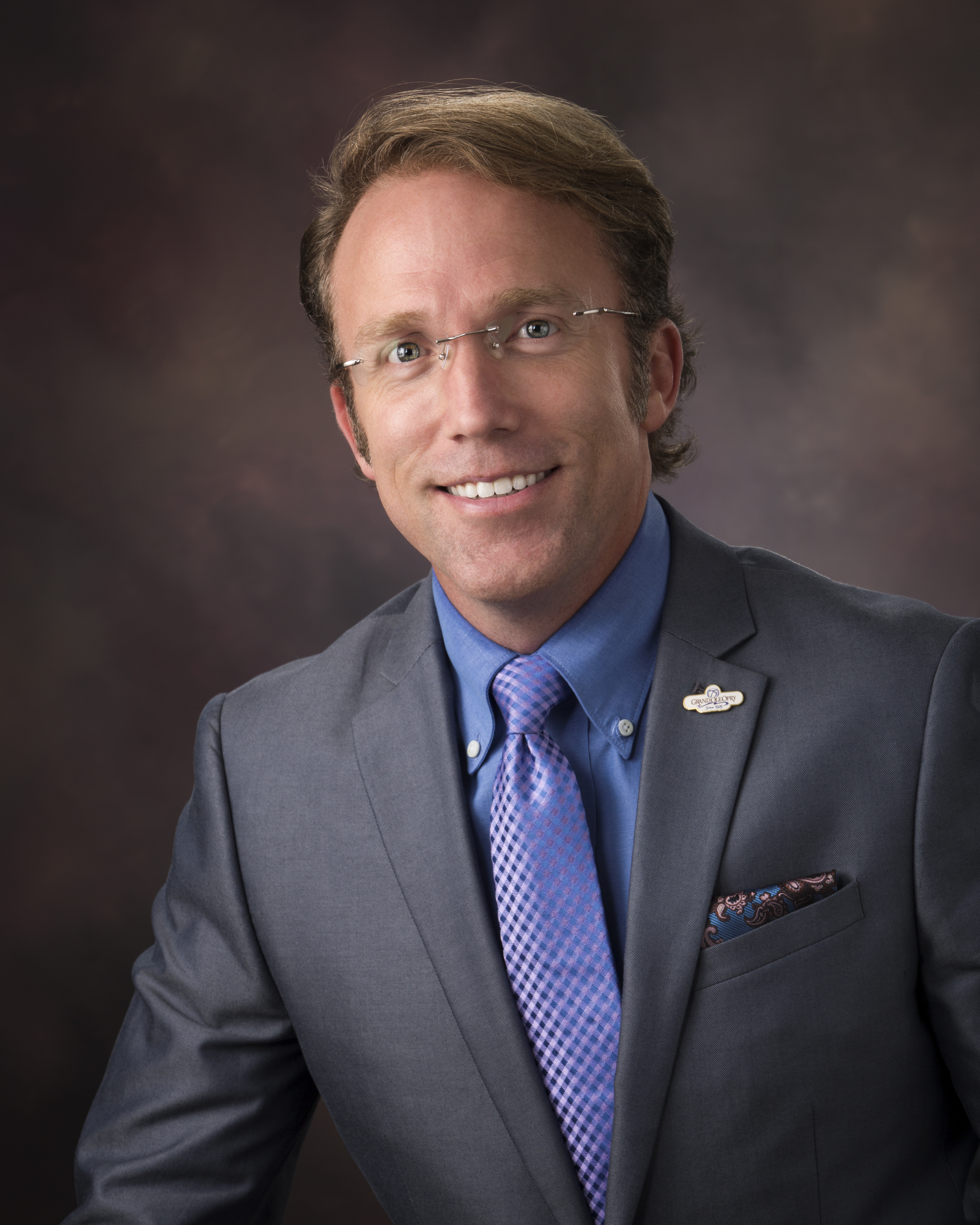
Kaine Riggan in 2016

Senior Center for the Arts, Inc. is a nonprofit arts center located in Nashville, Tennessee. It was founded in 2003 by Kaine Riggan as the nation's first multi-disciplined arts center for senior adults.

For each of its first five years in operation, the organization was able to double its operating budget annually and quickly became Nashville's third most attended theatre venue (Nashville Business Journal). Proceeds from tickets sold to Riggan's Nashville Dinner Theatre provided music, dance, theatre and art for seniors throughout middle Tennessee. Over 25,000 people attend the 200 seat dinner theatre each year.

== Fifty Forward ==
The Senior Center for the Arts is structured as a separate 501(c)(3) subsidiary of Fifty Forward which operates senior centers throughout middle Tennessee. By 2008, SCA had surpassed the generated revenue of all of the other Centers within the Fifty Forward network. In 2010, Fifty Forward branded the theatre program at SCA The Keeton Theatre.

== Awards ==
- Named one of Nashville's Top 20 Tourist Attractions (Nashville Business Journal)
- Ranked #3 among Nashville's Arts Organizations by attendance (Nashville Business Journal)
- Winner - Center for Nonprofit Management's Innovation In Action Award
